A dare game is a game in which people dare each other to perform actions that they would not normally do.

Gameplay 
The game is played by two or more players.

A player asks another to do something that one would not normally do or even think of doing themselves. The request may come in the form of "I dare you to..." or "Can you ...?". In order to stay in the game, one must perform the task they are dared to do. If a player refuses to do the challenge or fails to complete it, they lose and are out of the game. Often, losers are given nicknames like "loser" or "chicken".

Risks 
The game may involve dangerous or unhealthy tasks.

Yet, according to social worker Jennifer Moore-Mallinos, "very few children will back on the challenge no matter what the potential risks may be. Attempting the task is[, for them,] the only option." She adds that "although many of these dares begin with harmless requests, over time [they] have the tendency to develop into more serious demands."

Popularity and demographics 
The game's popularity is due to a person's need for recognition. It is commonly played by children.

In popular culture 
The game is portrayed in the English children's novel The Dare Game (2000) and the second episode of the first series of the TV adaptation of The Story of Tracy Beaker, and in the French film Love Me If You Dare (2003).

Similar games 
A variant of this game is called "follow the leader", in which children closely follow the one who is "the leader" and mimic all of their actions. Therefore, in that game the person who comes up with the dares does them first themselves.

See also 
 Truth or dare?
 Internet challenge

References 

Party games